The following is a list of stadiums in South America.

List

Argentina
Buenos Aires Lawn Tennis Club – Buenos Aires
Estadio 15 de Abril – Santa Fe
Estadio 23 de Agosto - San Salvador de Jujuy
Estadio Alberto J. Armando – Buenos Aires
Estadio Brigadier Estanislao López – Santa Fe
Estadio Ciudad de La Plata – Ciudad de La Plata
Estadio Ciudad de Vicente López – Vicente Lopez
Estadio Diego Armando Maradona – Buenos Aires
Estadio Don León Kolbovski – Buenos Aires
Estadio El Gigante del Norte – Salta
Estadio El Gigante de Alberdi – Córdoba
Estadio Eduardo Gallardón – Buenos Aires
Estadio Florencio Solá – Banfield
Estadio Gabino Sosa – Rosario
Estadio Dr. Lisandro de la Torre – Rosario
Estadio Instituto de Córdoba – Córdoba
Estadio José Amalfitani – Buenos Aires
Estadio José Luis Meiszner – Quilmes
Estadio José María Minella – Mar de Plata
Estadio José María Olaeta – Rosario
Estadio Juan Carlos Zerrillo – Ciudad de La Plata
Estadio Lanús – Lanús
Estadio Libertadores de América – Avellaneda
Estadio Malvinas Argentinas – Mendoza
Estadio Marcelo Bielsa – Rosario
Estadio Monumental Antonio Vespucio Liberti – Buenos Aires
Estadio Monumental de Victoria – Tigre
Estadio Cubierto Newell's Old Boys – Rosario
Estadio Nueva Chicago – Buenos Aires
Estadio Nueva España – Buenos Aires
Estadio Olímpico Chateau Carreras – Córdoba
Estadio Parque Roca – Buenos Aires
Estadio Pedro Bidegain – Buenos Aires
Estadio Presidente Juan Domingo Perón (El Cilindro) – Avellaneda
Estadio Ricardo Etcheverry – Buenos Aires
Estadio Tomás Adolfo Ducó – Buenos Aires

Bolivia
Estadio Félix Capriles – Cochabamba
Estadio Hernando Siles – La Paz
Estadio Olímpico Patria – Sucre
Estadio Ramón Tahuichi Aguilera – Santa Cruz

Brazil
Arena Coliseu Mateus Aquino – Alto Santo
Arena Joinville – Joinville
Arena Multiuso – Salvador
Estádio Ademar da Costa Carvalho (Ilha do Retiro) – Recife
Estádio Aderbal Ramos da Silva (Ressacada) – Florianópolis
Estádio Alberto Oliveira (Estádio Jóia da Princesa) – Feira de Santana
Estádio Alfredo Schurig (Fazendinha or Parque São Jorge) – São Paulo
Estádio Alfredo Jaconi – Caxias do Sul
Estádio Anísio Haddad (Rio Pretão) – São José do Rio Preto
Estádio Barão de Serra Negra – Piracicaba
Estádio Benedito Teixeira (Teixeirão) – São José do Rio Preto
Estádio Brinco de Ouro – Campinas
Estádio Centenário – Caxias do Sul
Estádio Centro Poliesportivo Pinheiro – Curitiba
Estádio Cícero Pompeu de Toledo (Morumbi) – São Paulo
Estádio Dr. Francisco de Palma Travassos, Ribeirão Preto
Estádio Eduardo José Farah (Farazhão) – Presidente Prudente
Estádio Fredis Saldívar (Douradão) – Dourados
Estádio Godofredo Cruz – Campos dos Goytacazes
Estádio Governador Alberto Tavares Silva (Albertão) – Teresina
Estádio Governador Ernani Sátiro (O Amigão) – Campina Grande
Estádio Heriberto Hülse – Criciúma
Estádio Jacy Scaff (Do Café) – Londrina
Estadio Governador João Castelo (Castelão) – São Luís
Estádio Governador José Fragelli (Verdão) – Cuiabá
Estádio Jornalista Mário Filho (Maracanã) – Rio de Janeiro
Estádio José Américo de Almeida Filho (Almeidão) – João Pessoa
Estádio José do Rego Maciel (Arruda) – Recife
Estádio José Pinheiro Borba (Beira Rio) – Porto Alegre
Estádio Kléber Andrade – Cariacica
Estádio Luiz José de Lacerda (Lacerdão) – Caruaru
Estádio Magalhães Pinto (Mineirão) – Belo Horizonte
Estádio Major Antônio do Couto Pereira – Curitiba
Estádio Major José Levy Sobrinho (Limeirão) – Limeira
Estádio Mané Garrincha – Brasília
Estádio Manoel Barradas (Barradão) – Salvador
Estádio Maria Lamas Farache (Frasqueirão) – Natal
Estádio Martins Pereira – São José dos Campos
Estádio Municipal Adail Nunes da Silva (Taquarão) – Taquaritinga
Estádio Municipal João Guido (Uberabão) – Uberaba
Estádio Municipal João Havelange (Parque do Sabiá) – Uberlândia
Estádio Municipal Juscelino Kubitschek – Itumbiara
Estádio Municipal Nhozinho Santos – São Luís
Estádio Municipal Prefeito Dilson Luiz de Melo (Melão) – Varginha
Estádio Municipal Radialista Mario Helênio – Juiz de Fora
Estádio Olímpico Colosso da Lagoa – Erechim
Estádio Olímpico Edgard Proença (Mangueirão) – Belém
Estádio Olímpico João Havelange – Rio de Janeiro
Estádio Olímpico Monumental – Porto Alegre
Estádio Olímpico Regional Arnaldo Busatto – Cascavel
Estádio Octávio Mangabeira (Fonte Nova) – Salvador
Estádio do Pacaembu, São Paulo
Estádio Palestra Itália (Parque Antártica) – São Paulo
Estádio Papa João Paulo II – Moji-Mirim
Estádio Pedro Victor de Albuquerque – Caruaru
Estádio Plácido Castelo – Fortaleza
Estádio Rei Pelé – Maceió
Estádio Santa Cruz – Ribeirão Preto
Estádio São Januário – Rio de Janeiro
Estádio Serra Dourada – Goiânia
Estádio da Universidade de Lavras – Lavras
Estádio Universitário Pedro Pedrossian (Morenão) – Campo Grande
Estádio Universitário São Paulo – São Paulo
Estádio Vivaldo Lima – Manaus
Estádio Waldomiro Pereira – Patos de Minas
Kyocera Arena – Curitiba (formerly Estádio Joaquim Américo, or Arena da Baixada)

Chile
Club Hípico de Santiago – Santiago
Coliseo La Tortuga – Talcahuano
Estadio Carlos Dittborn – Arica
Estadio El Cobre – El Salvador
Estadio El Teniente – Rancagua
Estadio Fiscal de Talca – Talca
Estadio La Granja – Curicó
Estadio La Portada – La Serena
Estadio Las Higueras – Talcahuano
Estadio Monumental David Arellano – Santiago
Estadio Municipal de Calama – Calama, Chile
Estadio Municipal de Concepción – Concepción
Estadio Municipal de La Cisterna – Santiago
Estadio Municipal de La Florida – La Florida
Estadio Municipal Francisco Sánchez Rumoroso – Coquimbo
Estadio Municipal Germán Becker – Temuco
Estadio Municipal Roberto Bravo Santibáñez – Melipilla
Estadio Municipal Rubén Marcos Peralta (Formerly Parque Schott) – Osorno
Estadio Nacional (Chile) – Santiago
Estadio Playa Ancha – Valparaíso
Estadio Regional de Antofagasta – Santiago
Estadio Regional de Chinquihue – Puerto Montt
Estadio San Carlos de Apoquindo – Santiago
Estadio Santa Laura – Independencia
Estadio Santiago Bueras – Maipú, Chile
Estadio Sausalito – Viña del Mar
Estadio Víctor Jara
Medialuna Monumental de Rancagua – Rancagua
Movistar Arena (Formerly Arena Santiago) – Santiago

Colombia

Atanasio Girardot Sports Complex – Medellín
Estadio Deportivo Cali – Cali
Estadio El Campín – Bogotá
Estadio General Santander – Cúcuta
Estadio Hernán Ramírez Villegas – Pereira
Estadio Metropolitano Roberto Meléndez – Barranquilla
Estadio Olímpico Pascual Guerrero – Cali

Ecuador
Estadio Monumental Isidro Romero Carbo – Guayaquil
Estadio La Casa Blanca – Quito
Estadio Modelo – Guayaquil
Estadio Olímpico Atahualpa – Quito

Falkland Islands
Sports Center – Stanley

French Guiana
Stade de Baduel – Cayenne

Guyana
Bourda Cricket Ground – Georgetown
Georgetown Football Stadium – Georgetown

Paraguay
Estadio Defensores del Chaco – Asunción
Estadio Feliciano Cáceres – Luque
Estadio General Pablo Rojas – Asunción
Estadio Manuel Ferreira – Asunción

Peru
Estadio Nacional Coloso de José Díaz – Lima Province
Estadio Universidad San Marcos – Lima Province
Estadio Monumental "U" – Lima Province
Estadio Alejandro Villanueva – Lima Province
Estadio Miguel Grau – Piura
Estadio Teodoro Lolo Fernández – Lima Province
Estadio Municipal de Chorrillos – Lima Province
Plaza de Acho – Lima Province
Plaza de Sol y Sombra – Lima Province
Estadio Monumental (Universidad Nacional San Agustín) – Arequipa
Estadio Mariano Melgar – Arequipa
Estadio Mansiche – Trujillo
Estadio Elías Aguirre – Chiclayo
Estadio Miguel Grau – Callao
Estadio Max Augustín – Iquitos
Estadio Manuel Gómez Arellano – Chimbote
Estadio Huancayo – Huancayo
Estadio Inca Garcilaso de la Vega – Cusco
Estadio Official de Pucallpa – Pucallpa
Estadio Jorge Basadre – Tacna
Estadio José Picasso Peratta – Ica
Estadio Campeones del 36 – Sullana
Estadio E. Torres Belón – Puno
Estadio Heraclio Tapia – Huánuco
Estadio Campeonísimo – Talara
Estadio Héroes de San Ramón – Cajamarca
Estadio Julio Lores Colán – Huaral
Estadio Monumental – Jauja
Estadio Daniel Alcides Carrión – Cerro de Pasco

Suriname
André Kamperveen Stadion – Paramaribo

Uruguay
Estadio Atilio Paiva Olivera – Rivera
Estadio Centenario – Montevideo
Estadio Gran Parque Central – Montevideo
Estadio Luis Franzini – Montevideo

Venezuela
Estadio Alfonso Chico Carrasquel – Puerto la Cruz
Estadio Antonio Herrera Gutiérrez – Barquisimeto
Estadio BR Julio Hernández Molina – Araure
Estadio José Bernardo Pérez – Valencia
Estadio José Pachencho Romero – Maracaibo
Estadio José Pérez Colmenares – Maracay
Estadio La Ceiba – San Félix
Estadio Luis Aparicio El Grande – Maracaibo
Estadio Metropolitano – San Cristóbal
Estadio Misael Delgado – Valencia
Estadio Olímpico – Caracas
Estadio Pueblo Nuevo – San Cristóbal
Estadio Universitario – Caracas

See also
List of stadiums in Africa
List of stadiums in Asia
List of stadiums in Central America and the Caribbean
List of stadiums in Europe
List of stadiums in North America
List of stadiums in Oceania
List of South American stadiums by capacity

References

External links 
Atlas of worldwide soccer stadiums for GoogleEarth ***NEW***
worldstadiums
cafe.daum.net/stade
Football Stadiums
Football Temples of the World

Stadiums
S